Moreno Soeprapto (born in Jakarta, Indonesia on November 14, 1982) is an Indonesian politician and former racing driver. He is the younger brother of Ananda Mikola, another former racing driver. Moreno Soeprapto also was the former member of Minardi F1 academy team in 2004.

Crash 
Soeprapto was involved in a car crash in 2006 at Sentul during the Asian Formula Three Championship when he drove into the rear of James Winslow. Winslow's car was damaged and he was pushed off onto the gravel, but Soeprapto's car rolled with the impact, landing on its side. Winslow left his car to investigate Soeprapto's condition and found him trapped in the car, with a broken fuel line spilling gasoline. Familiar with the car because he had previously driven it himself, Winslow turned off the fuel line and managed to dislodge Soeprapto so that the pair could flee immediately before the car "burst into flames".

Neither Soeprapto nor Winslow was injured. Winslow finished and won the race in a spare car, while Soeprapto was given a precautionary checkup at a nearby hospital. Soeprapto later said of the incident, "I ran into the back of James and the next thing I knew I was looking directly up at the sky. Then I heard James shouting at me. I owe my life to James because I was trapped in my car."

The crash was featured on the BBC programme Accidental Heroes, on 25 September 2008.

Racing achievements

References 

1982 births
People from Jakarta
Living people
Indonesian racing drivers
A1 Team Indonesia drivers
Formula V6 Asia drivers
Speedcar Series drivers
Great Indonesia Movement Party politicians
British Formula Renault 2.0 drivers
Asian Formula Three Championship drivers